China PR has participated in the AFC Asian Cup since 1976.

Overview

1976

Group A

Knockout stage
Semi-finals

Third place play-off

1980

Group A

1984

Group B

Knockout stage
Semi-finals

Final

1988

Group B

Knockout stage
Semi-finals

Third place play-off

1992

Group B

Knockout stage
Semi-finals

Third place play-off

1996

Group C

Knockout stage
Quarter-finals

2000

Group B

Knockout stage
Quarter-finals

Semi-finals

Third place play-off

2004

Group A

Knockout stage
Quarter-finals

Semi-finals

Final

2007

Group C

2011

Group A

2015

Group B

Knockout stage

Quarter-finals

2019

Group C

Knockout stage

Round of 16

Quarter-finals

References

 
Countries at the AFC Asian Cup